Antoine Karam (born 21 February 1950, in Cayenne) served as the President of the Regional Council (Conseil régional) of French Guiana, a région d'outre-mer of France, from 1992 to 2010.

Karam was born to a Lebanese father and a Saint Lucian mother. He is a professor of history and he was president of the Council from 22 January 1992 to 26 January 2010. As a member of the left-wing Guianese Socialist Party (PSG), allied to the French Socialist Party (PS), he is also French Guiana's single representative in the French Senate.

References

1950 births
Living people
People from Cayenne
Presidents of the Regional Council of French Guiana
French Guianan politicians
French socialists
French Guianan people of Lebanese descent
French Guianan people of Saint Lucian descent
French people of Lebanese descent
French people of Saint Lucian descent
Guianese Socialist Party politicians
La République En Marche! politicians
Senators of French Guiana